The third Women's U.S. Cup tournament held in 1999, were joined by four teams: Brazil, Finland, South Korea and USA.

Matches

Final placing

Goal scorers

References 

1999
1999 in women's association football
1999 in American women's soccer
1999 in Brazilian football
1999 in South Korean football
1999 in Finnish football
October 1999 sports events in the United States